The 2012 S.League was the 17th season of the S-League, the top professional football league in Singapore. It is known as the Great Eastern-Yeo's S.League for sponsorship reasons.

Tampines Rovers won their fourth title, finishing top of a 13-team league.

Teams
Etoile FC withdrew their participation in the league to concentrate on grassroots football and youth development. DPMM FC have re-entered the league, coming back since they were suspended by FIFA in the 2009 campaign. Harimau Muda of Malaysia have also entered the fray.

Managerial changes

Stadium changes

Tampines Rovers moved into the Clementi Stadium  due to the early commencement of the Tampines Sports Hub project which makes the Tampines Stadium unusable. 
With Tampines moving into the Clementi Stadium, Tanjong Pagar United are moving out and back to the Queenstown Stadium which they previously vacated back in 2004. Queenstown Stadium was last used by Etoile FC.

Foreign players

Albirex Niigata (S) and Harimau Muda are not allowed hire any foreigners.

League table

Results

Season statistics

Goalscorers
.

Attendance figures

S-League Awards Night Winners

Notes and references

External links
 Official site

Singapore Premier League seasons
1
Sing
Sing